Hennen is an Irish surname. Notable people with the surname include:

 Bernhard Hennen (born 1966), German writer
 Pat Hennen (born 1953), American motorcycle road racer
 Stephan Hennen (born 1990), German footballer
 Thomas J. Hennen (born 1952), United States Army warrant officer and astronaut